

Belgium
 International Association of the Congo 
 Frederic John Goldsmid, Administrator, International Association of the Congo (1884)
 Francis Walter de Winton, Administrator-General of the International Association of the Congo (1884–1885)

France

 Obock and Tadjoura – 
 Léonce Lagarde, Commissioner of Obock Territory (1883–1884)
 Léonce Lagarde, Commandant of Obock and Tadjoura (1884–1887)
 Oceania – Marie Nicolas François Auguste Morau, Governor of Oceania Colony (1883–1885)
 Riviéres du Sud – Jean-Marie Bayol, Lieutenant-Governor of Riviéres du Sud (1882–1891)

Portugal
 Angola – Francisco Joaquim Ferreira do Amaral, Governor-General of Angola (1882–1886)

United Kingdom
 Lagos Colony -
 Malta Colony
Arthur Borton, Governor of Malta (1878–1884)
Lintorn Simmons, Governor of Malta (1884–1888)
 New South Wales – Lord Augustus Loftus, Governor of New South Wales (1879–1885)
 Queensland – Sir Anthony Musgrave, Governor of Queensland (1883–1888)
 Tasmania – Major George Strahan, Governor of Tasmania (1881–1886)
 South Australia – Sir William Robinson, Governor of SouthAustralia (1883–1889)
 Victoria 
 George Phipps, Lord Normanby, Governor of Victoria (1879–1884)
 Henry, Lord Loch, Governor of Victoria (1884–1889)
 Western Australia – Sir Frederick Broome, Governor of Western Australia (1883–1890)

Colonial governors
Colonial governors
1884